Albert Austin Flatley (5 September 1919 – 9 April 1987) was an English footballer and football manager. An inside-forward, he was signed to Wolverhampton Wanderers, York City, Port Vale, Bradford, and Bury in the periods immediately before and after World War II. He then turned to coaching with Italian club Alessandria, before spending two years in charge at Workington from 1950 to 1952.

Career

Club career
Flatley was on the books of Wolverhampton Wanderers, before joining York City. His stay at Bootham Crescent was brief, as he played four Third Division North games for the "Minstermen" in the 1938–39 season. He joined Port Vale in June 1939, playing the opening two Third Division South games of the 1939–40 season before World War II stopped all professional football in England. During wartime he guested for Bradford Park Avenue, Bradford City and Halifax Town, before joining Bradford Park Avenue on a permanent basis in July 1944. After this he continued guesting for Halifax and later Hartlepool United. In December 1946, he transferred to Norman Bullock's Bury, though he never made his Second Division debut at Gigg Lane.

Player-manager
He played in Italy for Alessandria Calcio between 1948 and 1950, and also coached alongside Carlo Carcano, before returning to England as player-manager of non-league Workington in August 1950. At the end of the 1951–52 season, Workington were elected to the Football League. However Flatley resigned just after they had been re-elected and the club went on to finish bottom of the league.

Managerial career
Flatley had a coaching stint in India in 1954 where he was the assistant coach to the then India national team coach Syed Abdul Rahim at the 1954 Colombo Cup. He also managed the Bombay and India football teams for a brief period during the Soviet football team tour to India in 1955.

Career statistics

Playing statistics
Source:

Managerial statistics

References

1919 births
1987 deaths
Footballers from Bradford
English footballers
Association football inside forwards
Wolverhampton Wanderers F.C. players
York City F.C. players
Port Vale F.C. players
Bradford (Park Avenue) A.F.C. wartime guest players
Bradford City A.F.C. wartime guest players
Halifax Town A.F.C. wartime guest players
Bradford (Park Avenue) A.F.C. players
Hartlepool United F.C. wartime guest players
Bury F.C. players
U.S. Alessandria Calcio 1912 players
Workington A.F.C. players
English Football League players
Association football player-managers
English football managers
English expatriate football managers
English expatriate footballers
English expatriate sportspeople in Italy
Expatriate footballers in Italy
Expatriate football managers in Italy
U.S. Alessandria Calcio 1912 managers
Workington A.F.C. managers
India national football team managers
Expatriate football managers in India
English expatriate sportspeople in India